The Banquet of the Officers of the St George Militia Company in 1616 refers to the first of several large schutterstukken painted by Frans Hals for the St. George (or St. Joris) civic guard of Haarlem, and today is considered one of the main attractions of the Frans Hals Museum there.

Influenced by Cornelis van Haarlem

Hals was in his thirties when he painted this piece, and was far from established as a portrait painter. To be safe, he based most of his design on the painting of his predecessor, Cornelis Cornelisz van Haarlem, who painted the same militia company in 1599. 

Given a nearly impossible task, namely to complete his assignment but to add theatrical elements at the same time, Hals must have spent much time judging the politics of the group. He knew these men well as he served in the St. Joris militia himself from 1612–1615. In his painting, he indicates the political position of each man in the group as well as managing to give each a characteristic portrait. In Cornelis van Haarlem's piece the figures seem crammed into a tight space, and each face seems to have a similar expression. In Hals' group, an illusion of space and relaxed conversation is given. 

Officers were selected by the council of Haarlem to serve for three years, and this group had just finished their tenure and celebrated their end of service with a portrait. The man with the orange sash heads the table and the second in command is on his right. The three ensigns stand and the servant is carrying a plate.

Large painting on canvas

The men featured are from left to right Provost Johan van Napels, Colonel Hendrick van Berckenrode (wearing the orange sash), Captain Jacob Laurensz, Ensign Jacob Cornelisz Schout (holding the flag), Captain Vechter Jansz van Teffelen, Lieutenant Cornelis Jacobsz Schout, Lieutenant Hugo Mattheusz Steyn, a servant (standing in the back), Ensign Gerrit Cornelisz Vlasman, and Ensign Boudewijn van Offenberg. In the foreground seated in front of the table are Captain Nicolaes Woutersz van der Meer, and Lieutenant Pieter Adriaensz Verbeek. 

Besides portraying the men and the group dynamics, this painting shows off the Haarlem damast tablecloth, brocade pillows on the chairs and the halberds hanging on the wall. It also displays Hals' talents as a painter: Portraiture, Still life, and Landscape.

St. Jorisdoelen

The painting may have been painted on location, as Frans Hals lived in the Peuzelaarsteeg very close to the St. George militia headquarters (St. Jorisdoelen) who commissioned the painting, and managing a canvas of this size would have been a problem in Hals' studio. As an official art restorer employed by the city council, Hals had probably also already worked on paintings there. The premises had previously been the location of the women's convent called the St. Michielsklooster and after the old hall was refurbished in 1577 to house the St. Joris militia, a new hall in renaissance style was built at the north end in 1592.  The paintings by Hals and Cornelis van Haarlem hung in the renaissance building at the corner of the Grote Houtstraat. Today a restaurant, the windows overlook the garden of the Proveniershuis, but in the 17th century this was an area used for target practise.

Legacy

Hals' painting was a huge success, as he won several additional portrait commissions from the subjects and their relatives, as well as winning the commission to paint a group portrait of this militia again in 1627 and in 1639. In later years the painting was seen by visitors to Haarlem, as it remained hanging in its original building after it became an inn. The inn is featured on Romeyn de Hooghe's map of Haarlem in 1688, showing the gate with a statue of St. George slaying the dragon as silent witness to the building's earlier purpose. 

The Banquet of the Officers of the St George Militia Company in 1616 appears on the restaurant wall in the 1989 Peter Greenaway film The Cook, the Thief, His Wife & Her Lover.

See also
 The Banquet of the Officers of the St George Militia Company in 1627
 The Officers of the St George Militia Company in 1639

References

De Haarlemse Schuttersstukken, by Jhr. Mr. C.C. van Valkenburg, pp. 59–68, Haerlem : jaarboek 1958, 
Frans Hals: Exhibition on the Occasion of the Centenary of the Municipal Museum at Haarlem, 1862–1962., pp 29–30, publication Frans Hals Museum, 1962

Portraits by Frans Hals
History of Haarlem
Militia group portraits
Collections in the Frans Hals Museum
1616 paintings
Flags in art
Food and drink paintings